Duel at Sundown may refer to:

 "Duel at Sundown" (Maverick), an episode of the American TV series Maverick
 Duel at Sundown (film), a 1965 Spaghetti Western